The Story of I is the first solo album by former Yes keyboard player Patrick Moraz, released in June 1976.

Overview
After the success of Relayer, Yes next made a decision that each member would make a solo album. The Story of I is the first solo album by Patrick Moraz. By the time the album was released, Moraz was still touring with Yes but he was let go by the band in late 1976 after Rick Wakeman was booked on a session musician basis during the Going for the One recording sessions in Switzerland.

The album is based around a romantic story of a massive tower in the middle of a jungle. The tower lures people from all over the world to go inside it. Inside the tower, people are able to experience their wildest desires and fantasies. The only rule is that the people inside the tower may not fall in love with each other. However two people inside do so and decide to escape since the tower acts also as a prison which inhabitants are slaves of their own desires.

The album consists of fourteen tracks related to the story. The album, particularly the percussion section, is strongly influenced by Brazilian music. Much of the Latin percussion was recorded in Rio de Janeiro over two days in August 1975 and dubbed on to the tracks. The album uses pitch-bend controls on the synth/organ notes. The Story of I was chosen as the album of the year by Keyboard Magazine.

Reception

Allmusic's retrospective review praised the album's blending of styles, finding in the various tracks "hints of funk and marimba, Caribbean and South American styles, and even flamenco, all guided by Moraz's whirlwind keyboard playing." They also made special note of Andy Newmark's drumming and the strong variety of instruments, and concluded, "The Story of I is a refreshing twist from this progressive craftsman and can sincerely be appreciated by all audiences."

Track listing
All songs written by Patrick Moraz & John McBurnie (McBurnie's input is mostly limited to the lyrics in English).

All of the songs segue into each other except for 7 and 8, the point at which side one ended and side two began on the original vinyl release. However, track 8 begins similarly to the ending of track 7.

 "Impact" (3:31)
 "Warmer Hands" (3:31)
 "The Storm" (0:52)
 "Cachaça (Baião)" (4:07)
 "Intermezzo" (2:49)
 "Indoors" (3:44)
 "Best Years of Our Lives" (3:59)
 "Descent" (1:43)
 "Incantation (Procession)" (1:51) (includes a brief piece of a field recording of Amazon Indian music)
 "Dancing Now" (4:38)
 "Impressions (The Dream)" (2:49)
 "Like a Child in Disguise" (4:05)
 "Rise and Fall" (5:34)
 "Symphony in the Space" (2:56)

Personnel
Patrick Moraz - keyboards, piano, organ, synthesizers, marimbaphone, additional assorted percussion
John McBurnie - lead vocals
Vivienne McAuliffe -  vocals and additional lead vocals
Ray Gomez - lead and rhythm guitars
Jean de Antoni - lead and rhythm guitars
Jeff Berlin - bass 
Alphonse Mouzon - drums (1-7)
Andy Newmark - drums (8-14)
The Percussionists of Rio de Janeiro

Charts

Production
Arranged & Produced By Patrick Moraz
Recorded & Engineered By Chris 'Snoopy' Penycate & 'Professor' Jean Ristori

In popular culture
 Sections of the album were used as background music in the first radio series of The Hitchhiker's Guide to the Galaxy, e.g. Cachaça (Baião) used as a loop behind the news bulletin about Zaphod Beeblebrox stealing the Heart of Gold spaceship in Fit The Second.

References

1976 debut albums
Patrick Moraz albums
Concept albums
Atlantic Records albums
Charisma Records albums
Worldbeat albums